Standings and results for Group 7 of the UEFA Euro 1980 qualifying tournament.

Group 7 consisted of West Germany, Wales, Turkey and Malta. West Germany easily won the group, outrunning Turkey by three points.

Final table

Results

Goalscorers

References

Group 7
1978–79 in Welsh football
1979–80 in Welsh football
1978–79 in German football
Qual
1978–79 in Turkish football
1979–80 in Turkish football
1978–79 in Maltese football
1979–80 in Maltese football
1979–80 in German football